Jishou (Tujia: Jiersouv) is a county-level city and the seat of Xiangxi Tujia and Miao Autonomous Prefecture, Hunan province, China.

Located on the west of the province, the city is bordered to the northwest by Huayuan and Baojing Counties, to the northeast by Guzhang County, to the southeast by Luxi County, to the southwest by Fenghuang County. Jishou has four subdistricts, five towns and a township under its jurisdiction, the seat of the city is Qianzhou Subdistrict.

History
Jishou has a history of more than 2,000 years dating back to the Qin dynasty. In those days, it was affiliated with Qianzhong Prefecture. During the Song dynasty, a town government was established in a stockaded village, Zhenxi, which in the Ming dynasty became the Zhenxi soldiers and civilians battalion. Qianzhou Prefecture was created during the Qing dynasty. During the Republic of China era it was known as Qian County In 1953 the area was renamed Jishou county, with two adjacent cities, Jishou and Qianzhou. In 1982 Jishou city became the capital of Xiangxi Tujia and Miao Autonomous Prefecture. The city of Qianzhou now lies just south of Jishou city.

Geography
Jishou lies east of the Wuling Mountain range. About 80% of the city's terrain is low hills or low mountains. The highest elevation is 964.5 meters, at Liantaifeng (near the town of Aizhai and the lowest point is 142 meters, near the town of Hexi. The Dong River, a tributary of the Yuan River, runs west to east through the city.

Climate

Population
Jishou County had a population of 291,200 in the year 2008, including an agricultural population of 163,100, or 56% of the population. The urban population was 192,500. About 77.3% of the population belonged to the Miao or Tujia minorities, with 121,000 Miao and 101,200 Tujia. Members of China's predominant Han ethnic group comprise the rest of the population.

Education
Jishou has two institutions of higher education:
 Jishou University
 Normal College of Jishou University

Economy
In 2001, the gross domestic product in Jishou was 19.45 billion yuan, with a revenue of 1.45 billion yuan. Jishou produces fruits, especially kiwis and oranges, vegetables, livestock and poultry, and tobacco. Tourism is becoming an important industry, since the ancient city of Fenghuang, is about 30 minutes away and Dehang National Park is about 40 minutes away.

According to preliminary estimation, the gross domestic product in 2018 was CN￥16,762 million ($2,533 million), up by 10.1 percent over the previous year. Of this total, the value added of the primary industry was CN￥716 million ($108 million), up by 3.5 percent, that of the secondary industry was CN￥4,841 million ($732 million), up by 11.8 percent and that of the tertiary industry was CN￥11,206 million ($1,693 million), up by 9.8 percent. The value added of the primary industry accounted for 4.27 percent of the GDP; that of the secondary industry accounted for 28.88 percent; and that of the tertiary industry accounted for 66.85 percent. The GDP per capita in 2018 was CN￥44,849 ($6,777), up by 5.9 percent compared with the previous year.

Transportation
Bus routes run from Jishou to numerous towns and cities within Xiangxi and farther afield.
Direct trains connect Jishou to many of China's major cities, including Beijing, Shanghai, Guangzhou, and Changsha.
Jishou lacks an airport; the closest one with commercial service is located two hours away in Zhangjiajie.
G56 Hangzhou–Ruili Expressway and G65 Baotou–Maoming Expressway
China National Highway 209, China National Highway 319
The Aizhai Bridge, one of the world's highest and longest suspension bridges, is located approximately 20 minutes outside of town.

Gallery

References

External links
 Promotional video for Jishou and surrounding areas

 
Cities in Hunan
County-level divisions of Hunan
Xiangxi Tujia and Miao Autonomous Prefecture